Ronald John Freeman III (born June 12, 1947 in Elizabeth, New Jersey) is an American former athlete. At the 1968 Summer Olympics, Freeman won a gold medal in the 4×400 m relay and a bronze medal in the 400 meters.  Freeman ran the second leg on the American 4×400 m relay team, which won the gold medal with a new world record of 2.56.16. His relay leg time (43.2s) was the fastest 4x400 meter relay leg ever run and his time stood for more than 25 years.

Raised in Elizabeth, Freeman attended Thomas Jefferson High School.

Awards 

In August 2017, Freeman received the Athletes in Excellence Award from The Foundation for Global Sports Development in recognition of his community service efforts and work with youth.

Notes

References

1947 births
Living people
American male sprinters
Athletes (track and field) at the 1968 Summer Olympics
Olympic gold medalists for the United States in track and field
Sportspeople from Elizabeth, New Jersey
Thomas Jefferson High School (New Jersey) alumni
Track and field athletes from New Jersey
Medalists at the 1968 Summer Olympics